Galu Gazer (also Romanized as Galū Gāzer) is a village in Hanza Rural District, Hanza District, Rabor County, Kerman Province, Iran. At the 2006 census, its population was 168, in 35 families.

References 

Populated places in Rabor County